Rubus armeniacus, the Himalayan blackberry or Armenian blackberry,  is a species of Rubus in the blackberry group Rubus subgenus Rubus series Discolores (P.J. Müll.) Focke. It is native to Armenia and Northern Iran, and widely naturalised elsewhere. Both its scientific name and origin have been the subject of much confusion, with much of the literature referring to it as either Rubus procerus or Rubus discolor, and often mistakenly citing its origin as western European. Flora of North America, published in 2014, considers the taxonomy unsettled, and tentatively uses the older name Rubus bifrons.

In some areas, the plant is cultivated for its berries, but in many areas it is considered a noxious weed and an invasive species.

Description
Rubus armeniacus is a perennial plant that bears biennial stems ("canes") from the perennial root system. In its first year a new stem grows vigorously to its full length of 4–10 m, trailing along the ground or arching up to 4 m high. The stem is stout, up to 2–3 cm diameter at the base, and green; it is polygonal (usually hexagonal) in cross-section, with fearsome thorns up to 1.5cm long forming along the ribs. The canes can turn more red/purple if they are exposed to bright sunlight. This is common in the summer. The leaves on first year shoots are 7–20 cm long, palmately compound with either three or more commonly five leaflets. The leaflets are moderately serrated. Flowers are not produced on first year shoots. In its second year, the stem does not grow longer, but produces several side shoots, which bear smaller leaves with three leaflets (rarely a single leaflet). These leaflets are oval-acute, dark green above and pale to whitish below, with a toothed margin, and snaring, hooked thorns along the midrib on the underside. The flowers are produced in late spring and early summer on panicles of 3–20 together on the tips of the second-year side shoots, each flower 2–2.5 cm diameter with five white or pale pink petals. The flowers are bisexual (perfect) containing both male and female reproductive structures.

The fruit in  botanical terminology is not a  berry, but an aggregate fruit of numerous drupelets, 1.2–2 cm diameter, ripening black or dark purple. Both first and second year shoots are spiny, with short, stout, curved, sharp spines. Mature plants form a tangle of dense arching stems, the branches rooting from the node tip when they reach the ground.

Cultivation

Berry crop

The species was introduced to Europe in 1835 and to Australia and North America in 1885. It was valued for its fruit, similar to that of common blackberries (Rubus fruticosus and allies) but larger and sweeter, making it a more attractive species for both domestic and commercial fruit production. The immature fruits are smaller, red, and hard with a much more sour taste. The cultivars Himalayan Giant and Theodore Reimers are commonly planted. Rubus armeniacus was used in the cultivation of the Marionberry cultivar of blackberry.

Cover 
When established for several years, if left alone Rubus armeniacus can grow into a large cluster of canes. These thickets can provide good nesting grounds for birds, and help to provide places to rest/hide for other slightly larger mammals, such as rabbits, squirrels, and beavers.

As an invasive species

Spread 
Rubus armeniacus was first introduced to North America in 1885 by Luther Burbank in Santa Rosa, California using seeds that he imported from India. The species thrived in its new environment, notably for the large amount of berries it produced and was soon grown and cultivated in the United States by 1915. It soon escaped from cultivation and has become an invasive species in most of the temperate world and the United States Pacific Coast by 1945. Because it is so hard to contain, it quickly gets out of control, with birds and other animals eating the fruit and then spreading the seeds. It is highly flammable and a common ladder fuel for wildfires, due to the litter and dead canes produced by the plant.

It is especially established west of the Cascades in the American Pacific Northwest and in parts of southern British Columbia along the coast, in the Lower Mainland, and throughout Vancouver Island. It does well in riparian zones due to the abundance of other species in these areas, which allows it to go relatively unnoticed until it has had a chance to establish itself. Unlike other invasive species, this plant can easily establish itself and continue to spread in ecosystems that have not experienced a disturbance.

Management 
Cutting the canes to the ground, or burning thickets of Rubus armeniacus are ineffective removal strategies. The best practices for removal include digging up the rhizomes and connecting underground structures, and herbicides. Broken roots can resprout, making manual removal extra labor intensive, and glyphosate herbicides are largely ineffective with this plant.

See also
 Black raspberry
 Rubus allegheniensis, common blackberry, native to Eastern U.S.

References

External links
 
 
 
 Rubus_armeniacus Bugwood Wiki
 photo of herbarium specimen at Missouri Botanical Garden, collected in Missouri in 1995

armeniacus
Flora of Asia
Berries
Plants described in 1874